Tekar is a rural locality (a village) in Voskresenskoye Rural Settlement, Cherepovetsky District, Vologda Oblast, Russia. The population was 15 as of 2002.

Geography 
Tekar is located 56 km northeast of Cherepovets (the district's administrative centre) by road. Deminskaya is the nearest rural locality.

References 

Rural localities in Cherepovetsky District